Gawthorpe may refer to:

 Gawthorpe, Kirklees, a hamlet near Huddersfield, West Yorkshire, England
 Gawthorpe, Wakefield an area of Ossett, in the Wakefield district, West Yorkshire, England
 Gawthorpe (ward), a UK electoral ward covering Padiham, Lancashire, England
 Gawthorpe Hall, an Elizabethan house in Padiham, Lancashire, England
 Mary Gawthorpe (1881–1973), British suffragette